Paul of Antioch was a medieval Christian bishop and writer.

Paul of Antioch may also refer to:

Paul of Samosata, bishop of Antioch from 260 to 268
Paul the Jew, Chalcedonian patriarch of Antioch from 519 to 521
Paul the Black, Miaphysite patriarch of Antioch from 551 or 564